Neville Stibbard may refer to:

 Neville Stibbard (footballer, born 1923), Australian rules footballer for South Melbourne and North Melbourne
 Neville Stibbard (footballer, born 1952), AFL recruiter and former Australian rules footballer for South Melbourne